Tulad ng Dati (Filipino, "Just Like Before") is a Philippine independent film released in 2006. Director Michael Sandejas,  calls the film "an alternate reality musical drama". The film's plot revolves around the Filipino rock band the Dawn, and the film itself is part-documentary, part-fiction; an inadvertent tribute to the Dawn founding member and guitarist Teddy Diaz, who was murdered in 1988, shortly after the band achieved commercial success.

The film's title is taken from the band's ninth studio album, titled Tulad ng Dati, which was also released in 2006 but was not intended to serve as a soundtrack to the film.

Plot
The Dawn achieves fame and success in the 1980s, but after the murder of founding member and guitarist Teddy Diaz and  years of decline, the band is finding it hard to continue playing. Middle-aged vocalist Jett Pangan's house is burglarized and he is knocked unconscious, waking up later suffering from amnesia. All he can remember is that he is in his 20s, and that it is the peak of his band's success. Jett can't quite come to terms with his situation and he insists on living as his 1980s self.

Cast
Jett Pangan as himself
JB Leonor as himself
Francis Reyes as himself
Buddy Zabala as himself
Carlos Balcells as himself
Ping Medina as Teddy Diaz
Agot Isidro as Beth Pangan, Jett's wife
Mylene Dizon as Katrina, Jett's ex-girlfriend
Zoe Sandejas as Erica Pangan, Jett's daughter

Cameo appearances
Raimund Marasigan of Sandwich
Karl Roy of Kapatid
Imago
Stonefree, Ratbunitata, TroubleSpots and Juan Tamad

Competitions and awards
The film was a finalist in the full-length feature category of the 2006 Cinemalaya Philippine Independent Film Festival. Tulad ng Dati won Cinemalaya awards for "Best Editing" (Mikael Pestaño), "Best Film" and "Best Sound" (Ronald de Asis) in 2006, as well as Gawad Urian Awards for "Best Sound" (Ronald de Asis), "Best Actor" (Jett Pangan), "Best Music" (the Dawn, Francis Reyes and Buddy Zabala), "Best Supporting Actor" (Ping Medina) and "Best Supporting Actress" (Agot Isidro) in 2007. 
The film also competed in Korea's Pusan International Film Festival, and was also included in the official selection of the Hawaii International Film Festival.

References

External links

2006 films
2000s musical drama films
Philippine drama films
2006 drama films